Ace is a given name, nickname, and surname. Notable people and fictional characters with the name include:

People with the given name 

 Ace Adams (1910–2006), American Major League Baseball relief pitcher
 Ace Andres (born 1958), American guitarist. songwriter, vocalist, and political activist
 Ace Atkins (born 1970), American crime reporter and author
 Ace Loomis (1928–2003), American National Football League player
 Ace Mahbaz (born 1986), Iranian actor and writer
 Ace Norton (born 1982), Japanese-American filmmaker and artist
 Ace Rusevski (born 1956), Macedonian retired boxer who represented Yugoslavia at the 1976 Summer Olympics
 Ace Vergel (1952–2007), Filipino actor
 Ace Von Johnson, American guitarist

People with the nickname 

 Alfredo Aceves (born 1982), Major League Baseball relief pitcher
 Jim Adams (lacrosse) (born c. 1929), American retired lacrosse coach, member of the National Lacrosse Hall of Fame
 Ace Bailey (1903–1992), Canadian National Hockey League player
 Garnet Bailey (1948–2001), Canadian National Hockey League player and scout who died in 9/11 attacks
 Ace Barbers (born 1969), Filipino politician
 Ace Bhatti (born 1970), British actor
 Ace Brigode (1893–1960), American dance band leader and musician
 Ace Cannon (1934–2018), American saxophonist
 Ace Custis (born 1974), American basketball player and coach
 Austin Dillon (born 1990), American racing driver nicknamed "The Ace"
 Ace Durano (born 1970), Filipino politician
 Ace Enders (born 1982), America lead singer and guitarist of the band The Early November
 Rich Franklin (born 1974), American MMA fighter
 Ace Frehley (born 1951), rock and roll guitarist and former member of the rock band Kiss
 Leo Gottlieb (born 1920), American basketball player
 Ace Gruenig (1913–1958), American basketball player
 Ace Gutowsky (1909–1976), American National Football League player
 Ace Harris (1910–1964), American jazz pianist
 Ace Herman (1913–1971), American film editor and producer
 Ace Kefford (born 1946), English rock bass guitarist
 Ace Khuse (born 1968), South African retired association football player and current interim coach
 James Lyons (admiral) (born 1927), United States Navy admiral
 Ace Magashule (born 1959), South African politician
 Ace Mumford (1898–1962), African-American college football head coach
 Patrick Ntsoelengoe (1952–2006), South African footballer
 Ace Parker (1912–2013), American National Football League quarterback and Major League Baseball player and coach, member of Pro Football Hall of Fame
 Ace Powell (1912–1978), American painter, sculptor, and etcher
 Ace Reid (1925–1991), American cartoonist
 Ace Sanders (born 1991), American National Football League player
 Ace Stewart (1869–1912), Major League Baseball player in 1895
 Judd Trump (born 1989), snooker player nicknamed "The Ace"
 Ace Williams (1917–1999), American Major League Baseball pitcher
 Ace Young (born 1980), American singer, songwriter, and actor

People with the stage name or pen name 

 Ace (gamer) (born 1993), American Halo player Aaron Elam
 Ace and Vis, British radio presenters
 Ace Backwords (born 1956), underground cartoonist
 Ace Hood (born 1989), American rapper Antoine McColister
 Ace Wilder (born 1982), Swedish singer Alice Gernandt
 Buddy Ace (1936–1994), American blues singer James Lee Land
 Johnny Ace (1929–1954), American singer John Marshall Alexander Jr.
 Mellow Man Ace (born 1967), American rapper Ulpiano Sergio Reyes

People with the ring name 

 Ace Austin (born 1997), American professional wrestler Austin Highley
 Ace Darling (born 1974), American professional wrestler Charleston Diggler
 Ace Hood (born 1988), American rapper Antoine McColister
 Ace Romero (born 1990), American professional wrestler Justin Romero
 Ace Steel (born 1973), American professional wrestler Christopher Guy
 Ace Wilder (born 1982), Swedish singer and songwriter Alice Gernandt
 Johnny Ace (born 1962), American professional wrestler John Laurinaitis

People with the surname 

 Goodman Ace (1899–1982), American humorist, radio writer and comedian, television writer, and magazine columnist born Goodman Aiskowitz
 Jane Ace (1897–1974), American radio performer, wife of Goodman Ace
 Juliet Ace (born 1938), British dramatist, playwright and radio and television writer

Fictional characters 
 Ace, a Reptool in the animated series Dinotrux
 Ace, in the Doctor Who television series
 Ace, in the G.I. Joe universe
 Ace, a member of the Royal Flush Gang in the DC Animated Universe
 Ace the Bat-Hound, a canine crime-fighting partner of Batman
 Ace the Wonder Dog, a canine actor active in the 1930s and 1940s
 Ace Blackwell, in Half & Half
 Ace Bunny, in Loonatics Unleashed
 Ace Drummond, the title character of the comic strip Ace Drummond
 Rory Gilmore, from Gilmore Girls – nicknamed Ace by Logan Huntsburger
 Ace Lightning, in Ace Lightning
 Acelin Ace McDougal, character in Get Ace
 John "Ace" Merrill, the main antagonist of Stephen King's The Body
 Ace Riker, from the animated series M.A.S.K.
 Ace Rimmer, an alter ego of Arnold Rimmer in Red Dwarf
 Ace Ventura, in Ace Ventura media
 Acid Ace, a supporting character in Mega Man Star Force 3
 Portgas D. Ace, in One Piece
 Ultraman Ace, from the Japanese television drama of the same name
 Eight Ace, from the British adult comic Viz
 Ace Copular, in The Powerpuff Girls franchise
Ace, a jock bird character in the Animal Crossing series
 Ace, an editable character in the challenge mode of the game Street Fighter EX3
 Ace, alter-ego of Dexter, the main protagonist of the 1984 video game Space Ace.
 Ace, a playable character in Square Enix's action role-playing game Final Fantasy Type-0
 Ace, a duck in the English-language version of the animated film Leafie, A Hen into the Wild
 Ace, a female costume character in the video game Fortnite
 Ace Visconti, a lucky gambler in the video game Dead by Daylight
 Ace Rothstein, a mobster based on Frank Rosenthal in the movie Casino.
Ace Sorensen, a character in PAW Patrol.
 Ace Ukiyo, the protagonist of the tokusatsu series Kamen Rider Geats
 Ace, a Warrior in The Warriors

See also 
 
 
 Ace (disambiguation)

References 

English masculine given names
Masculine given names
Lists of people by nickname
English-language surnames